Gregory Leonard George Barker, Baron Barker of Battle,  (born 8 March 1966) is a British Conservative Party politician and life peer. In May 2010 he was appointed Minister of State for Energy and Climate Change, a role in which he served until 2014. At the following year's general election he stood down as MP for Bexhill and Battle and was appointed to the House of Lords.

Early life and education
Born in Sussex, Barker attended Upper Beeding Primary School, Steyning Grammar School and Lancing College. In 1987, he earned a bachelor's degree in history and politics from Royal Holloway College, London. In 1990–91, he attended a corporate finance programme at London Business School.

Early career
Barker was a researcher at the Centre for Policy Studies in 1987, before joining Gerard Vivian Gray as an equity analyst in 1988, and was a member of the Honourable Artillery Company between 1989 and 1994. In 1990, he became the director for International Pacific Securities. He was the deputy chairman of Hammersmith Conservative Association in 1993. From 1998, he was a director of Daric plc, an advertising company.

Barker also developed strong links to the Russian oil companies, being head of communications at the Anglo-Siberian Oil Company from 1998 to 2000 and also worked in London and Moscow for the Sibneft Oil Group, owned by Roman Abramovich.

Career

House of Commons 
Barker was at first unsuccessful in his attempts to be elected to Parliament when he contested the safe Labour seat of Eccles in Greater Manchester, where he was defeated by Ian Stewart. Barker then became the deputy chairman of Tooting Conservative Association and an advisor to Conservative MP David Willetts.

In 2001, Barker became the MP for Bexhill and Battle after the retirement of the sitting Conservative MP, Charles Wardle. Barker's nomination by the Conservative Party was hotly debated when sitting MP and former Home Office minister Charles Wardle accused Barker of being disingenuous about his business career and after the election, formally requesting new Conservative Party Leader Iain Duncan Smith to investigate possible links between Barker and the infamous Russian billionaire Boris Berezovsky. Wardle supported Nigel Farage (who later became the Leader of the United Kingdom Independence Party), but Barker won the safe seat securing over 10,500 votes ahead of the Liberal Democrat candidate, Stephen Hardy.

Close to Conservative leader David Cameron, Barker, in his capacity as Shadow Environment Minister (which he served in from 2005-2008), accompanied Cameron on his trip to the Arctic Circle in April 2006 for a fact-finding mission about global warming.

In April 2011, Barker was filmed addressing an audience at the Moore School of Business at the University of South Carolina, during which he said of the Conservative-led British government: "We are making cuts that Margaret Thatcher, back in the 1980s, could only have dreamed of."

Barker was implicated in the 2009 MPs' expenses scandal for his purchase and sale of London flats; this led to widespread outrage from tax payers.

On 5 February 2013 MP Gregory Barker voted in favour in the House of Commons Second Reading vote on marriage equality in Britain.

On 14 July 2014, he announced he would not be standing at the 2015 general election.

House of Lords
In August 2015, Barker was nominated for a life peerage in the Dissolution Peerages List. On 12 October 2015, he was created Baron Barker of Battle, of Battle in the County of East Sussex. On 10 November of that year, he was introduced to the Lords. He was supported during the ceremony by John Browne, Baron Browne of Madingley, and Guy Black, Baron Black of Brentwood.

In February 2019, Barker took a leave of absence from the House of Lords upon accepting an executive chairmanship position with the En+ Group. Barker was credited with having helped the Russian company to have the US sanctions lifted earlier that year, for which he was awarded a bonus of about £3-4 million (US$3.9-$5.2 million) that he described as "relatively modest".

Business 
Barker was appointed as Independent Chairman of the Board of Directors of En+ Group in October 2017, a company owned by the Russian oligarch Oleg Deripaska, who sits on the U.S. sanctions list. In February 2019, he was appointed as Executive Chairman of the Board. In March 2022 he resigned as chairman of EN+.  The Guardian wrote, "The new company [a company En+ is considering setting up] would be owned by management and non-Russian investors, and potentially led by Barker, according to a report by Bloomberg News that was referenced by EN+. It would take on Rusal’s alumina, bauxite and aluminium assets across the world, including in Africa, Australia and Europe."

Personal life
Barker married Celeste Harrison, an heiress to the Charles Wells brewery fortune, in 1992. Following a diary report in The Observer, Barker confirmed he and his wife had separated, and on 26 October 2006 the British tabloid newspaper the Daily Mirror revealed that he had left his wife and children for vintage fashion expert William Banks-Blaney. The paper backed the story by quoting his mother-in-law.
The Independent on Sunday later reported that Barker has confirmed that he is gay.

In 2009, Barker's wealth was estimated at £3.9m.

In May 2012, Barker attracted media attention, after it was reported he had used a staff microwave at the Department of Energy and Climate Change to warm a cushion for his pet dachshund, Otto.

References

External links

 Gregory Barker MP Official constituency website

 MP works as hospital ward cleaner, BBC News, 22 June 2007

Conservative Party (UK) MPs for English constituencies
UK MPs 2001–2005
UK MPs 2005–2010
UK MPs 2010–2015
Conservative Party (UK) life peers
Life peers created by Elizabeth II
Alumni of Royal Holloway, University of London
Gay politicians
Members of the Privy Council of the United Kingdom
People educated at Steyning Grammar School
People educated at Lancing College
People from Worthing
1966 births
Living people
English LGBT politicians
LGBT life peers
LGBT members of the Parliament of the United Kingdom